Sedorre is a town in the northern Obock region of Djibouti.

External links
Satellite map at Maplandia.com

Populated places in Djibouti